India made its Summer Paralympic debut at the 1968 Games, competed again in 1972, and then was absent until the 1984 Games. The country has participated in every edition of the Summer games since then. It has never participated in the Winter Paralympic Games.

India's first medal in Paralympics came in 1974 Games, with Murlikant Petkar winning a gold medal in swimming. India's best finish yet has been in the 2020 Games, at 24th place with a medal haul of 19 medals (5 gold, 8 silver and 6 bronze).

History 

India's first medal, and also the first individual gold medal, was won in 1972 Games, when Murlikant Petkar swam the 50 meters freestyle in a world record time of 37.331 seconds. India finished at 25th rank in those games. In 1984, Joginder Singh Bedi won silver at the Men's Shot Put and followed it up with a pair of bronze winning performances in the Discus and Javelin throws. Thus, Joginder became the first multi-medallist Paralympian from India. Bhimrao Kesarkar also won a silver medal in Javelin in 1984 Games. India finished 43rd out of the 54 participating nations.

India continued to participate in each Paralympic Games thereafter, but failed to make an impact until the 2004 Games when Devendra Jhajharia won gold in javelin throw and Rajinder Singh Rahelu won bronze for powerlifting in the 56-kg category.

In 2016 Games, Deepa Malik won a silver medal in Shot Put to become the first Indian woman to win a Parlaympics medal.

The 2020 Games saw India's best-ever medal haul with a total of 19 medals (5 Gold, 8 Silver and 6 Bronze). This result was better than the medal haul of 12 medals of all previous Paralympics appearances combined. The games also had India's best ever participation yet with 54 athletes (40 men, 14 women) across nine sports. It was India's best performance by an overall ranking of 24 (among 162 nations; including Refugee Paralympic Team and Russian Paralympic Committee).

Shooter Avani Lekhara won two medals - gold in 10m Air Rifle SH1 and bronze in 50m Rifle 3 Positions SH1. Thus, she became the first Indian woman to win an individual gold medal and first woman multi-medalist. Shooter Singhraj Adhana also won two medals - silver in 50m Pistol SH1 and bronze in 10m Air Pistol SH1 categories. Para-badminton player Suhas Lalinakere Yathiraj became the first civil servant to win a Paralympic medal, a silver in SL4 category.

In 2020 Games, Vinod Kumar initially clinched a bronze medal in the men's discus throw F52 category event. However, other competitors raised questions about his disability and was subsequently designated as "Classification not Completed". His performance was disqualified, resulting in the loss of his medal.

Medals

Medals by Summer Games

Medals by Summer Sport

Medalists

Multiple Medalists

2012 Games Village Controversy
During the 2012 Summer Paralympics it was reported that coaches and escorts of the Indian Team were denied accommodation in the Games Village because their permits were being used by officials of the Paralympic Committee of India.  The Team's 10 athletes were to be assisted by six coaches and five escorts, but only two escorts were given passes; Paralympic Committee General Secretary Ratan Singh confirmed that he had brought his son, that the Committee president had brought his wife, and the treasurer had brought his wife and daughter.

See also
India at the Olympics
India at the World Games
India at the Asian Games
India at the Commonwealth Games
India at the Lusofonia Games
India at the South Asian Games

References